The Raleigh mayoral election of 2003 was held on October 7, 2003, to elect a Mayor of Raleigh, North Carolina. The election is non-partisan. It was won by incumbent mayor Charles Meeker, who defeated John Odom in the primary. Because Meeker won more than 50% in the first round, there was no need for a run-off.

Results

Footnotes

2003
Raleigh
2003 North Carolina elections